The 2001 Tour de Suisse was the 65th edition of the Tour de Suisse cycle race and was held from 19 June to 28 June 2001. The race started in Rust and finished in Lausanne. The race has no overall winner. Although Lance Armstrong originally won the event, he was stripped of the title due to violating anti-doping regulations. In 2012, the United States Anti-Doping Agency disqualified him from his results after 1 August 1998. The verdict was confirmed by the Union Cycliste Internationale.

Teams
Seventeen teams of eight riders started the race:

Route

General classification

Notes

References

2001
Tour de Suisse